William Henry Stevenson (September 23, 1891 – March 19, 1978) was a member of the United States House of Representatives from Wisconsin for the years 1941–1949, he served as a Republican.

William Stevenson was born in Kenosha, Wisconsin and his family moved to La Crosse, Wisconsin when he was young. Stevenson graduated from the La Crosse Normal School (now the University of Wisconsin–La Crosse) and taught in area high schools. He went to law school in Madison and was admitted to the bar. Stevenson was District Attorney for Richland County, Wisconsin from 1924 to 1926. He moved to La Crosse and was District Attorney for La Crosse County from 1935 until 1941. In 1940 he was elected to the 77th United States Congress representing Wisconsin's 3rd congressional district. He was reelected to the following three congresses as well serving from January 3, 1941, till January 3, 1949. Stevenson died in La Crosse and was buried in Onalaska, Wisconsin.

See also
Badger Army Ammunition Plant

References

External links 
 William Henry Stevenson entry at The Political Graveyard
 

1891 births
1978 deaths
Politicians from Kenosha, Wisconsin
Politicians from La Crosse, Wisconsin
University of Wisconsin–La Crosse alumni
University of Wisconsin–Madison alumni
University of Wisconsin Law School alumni
District attorneys in Wisconsin
Republican Party members of the United States House of Representatives from Wisconsin
20th-century American politicians